You've Still Got a Place in My Heart is an album by American country music artist George Jones released in 1984 on the Epic Records label.

Background
You've Still Got A Place In My Heart was released the same year that Jones finally got sober at 52 years old.  His wife Nancy told The Texas Monthly in 1994 that the first show Jones played sober in Birmingham, Alabama "was terrible.  He was like a scared puppy.  'I can’t do it,' he said.  'I can’t go on.'  He was begging and breaking down and dying for a drink.  And when he got out there on that stage, and after the first song, he looked out to me in the audience, and he seemed like such a poor, lost, wounded soul that I burst into tears."  Jones, who had been written off for dead countless times in the previous decade, stated to the Associated Press in June of that year, "All my life it seems like I’ve been running from something.  If I knew what it was, maybe I could run in the right direction.  But I always seem to end up going the other way."  He persevered, however, and the singer managed the longest stretch of sobriety of his adult life, largely thanks to the support of his wife, who had also become his manager.

Recording
You've Still Got a Place in My Heart includes three songs from earlier albums. "I'm Ragged But I'm Right" is a remake of a song that appeared on the singer's debut 1956 album, Grand Ole Opry's New Star.  "Even the Bad Times are Good" is a remake of a song from his 1965 album, Mr. Country & Western Music.  "Come Sundown" (a Bobby Bare cover written by Kris Kristofferson) is just a reissue of the exact song Jones had released on his 1974 album, I Can Love You Enough.

The title track, which peaked at number 3 (Jones's ninth top ten hit in four years), is a cover of a 1950 Leon Payne recording that has been covered by multiple artists.  Many of the numbers are up-tempo and optimistic, especially the heartfelt "The Second Time Around", which sounds like a tribute to Nancy Jones.  He also gives a Johnny Cash-spirited narration on the novelty song "Courtin' in the Rain".  "Your Lying Blue Eyes" is a cover of a 1979 hit song by John Anderson.

Track listing

References

External links
 George Jones' Official Website
 Record Label

1984 albums
George Jones albums
Epic Records albums
Albums produced by Billy Sherrill